Muji is a Japanese retail company.

Muji may also refer to:

Places
 Muji, Xinjiang, a town in Guma (Pishan) County, Hotan Prefecture, Xinjiang, China
 Muji Township, a township in Akto, Kizilsu, Xinjiang, China

Offensive word
 Muji, is an offensive Nepalese word which is also used to describe pubic hair